Khamosh Nigahen may refer to:

 Khamosh Nigahen (1946 film), a Bollywood film
 Khamosh Nigahen (1986 film), a Bollywood film